Needlessly and Causelessly (Persian: بی‌خود و بی‌جهت, romanized: Bikhodo Bi Jehat) is a 2012 Iranian drama film directed, written and produced by Abdolreza Kahani. The film screened for the first time at the 30th Fajr Film Festival.

The film was generally praised for its acting and ensemble cast, with Attaran, Bahram, Javaherian and Mehranfar being singled out for praise.

Premise 
two couples are stuck in a house together. one of the couples are going to host a wedding party at the house tonight but the other couple are still there with their boxes and stuff.

Cast 

 Reza Attaran as Mohsen Tootoonchi
 Pantea Bahram as Mojgan
 Negar Javaherian as Elahe
 Ahmad Mehranfar as Farhad
 Alireza Ostadi as Driver
 Mohammad Kart as Driver's Assistant
 Afsaneh Tehranchi as Elahe's Mother
 Amir Alikhani as Sina
 Behnam Sharfi as Satellite guy

Controversy 
The film was theatrically released in Iran on November 28, 2012, but after a few days, the release of the film in Qom was stopped by the order of the General Directorate of Guidance of this province.

National Iranian Radio and Television has also refused to air the promotional teasers of the film on TV.

Reception

Accolades

References

External links 

 
Films set in Iran
Films shot in Iran
Iranian drama films
2010s Persian-language films